Aye San (24 December 1988 – 12 June 2020) was a Burmese footballer who played as a defender.

Club career
Aye San played for Kanbawza (now Shan United) and Nay Pyi Taw before retiring in 2015 to become a coach.

International career
Aye San represented Myanmar at the 2007 and 2011 SEA Games, winning medals on both occasions.

He made his debut for the senior national team in 2008.

International goals

Death
Aye San died on 12 June 2020 when he drowned during a visit to Thayet Chaung Waterfall in Dawei.

References

1988 births
2020 deaths
Deaths by drowning
Burmese footballers
Myanmar international footballers
Association football defenders
Southeast Asian Games silver medalists for Myanmar
Southeast Asian Games bronze medalists for Myanmar
Southeast Asian Games medalists in football
Competitors at the 2007 Southeast Asian Games
Sportspeople from Yangon